Thénia, sometimes written as Thenia, with around 40,000 inhabitants, is the chief town in the daïra of the same name, in the wilaya of Boumerdès, in northern Algeria. Historically, the name is a contraction of Theniet Beni Aicha (ثنية بني عائشة) "the mountain pass of the sons of Aisha", the Arabic translation of the Kabyle Berber toponym  Tizi n At Ɛica. The steep-sided pass, which is only about 800 metres wide at its narrowest point, is sometimes taken to mark the transition between Mitidja and Grande Kabylie.

Villages
The villages of the commune of Thénia are:

Geography
Thénia is located on the main road from Algiers to Constantine, about forty kilometres east of Algiers, about ten kilometres inland from the coast, at an altitude of 300 metres—an excerpt from the 1962 Michelin map of Algeria showing the location can be seen here. Between the town and the coast, the scrub-covered Djebel bou Arous rises to a height of around 400 metres and then falls more gently to the coast. South and east is the valley of the Isser River, whose sides rise to around 600 metres and are deeply incised by streams; in many places the slopes are covered with vineyards and olive-groves.

Thénia is on the double-track portion of the Algiers-Skikda line and marks the end of electric commuter rail service from Algiers station.

Zawiya

 Zawiyet Sidi Boushaki

History

During the French occupation, the town was renamed Ménerville, after Charles-Louis Pinson de Ménerville (1808–76), the first president of the court of appeals in Algiers. It resumed the name of Thénia a few years after independence in 1962.

In 1944, the town had 2,656 inhabitants, of which the majority, 1,929, were European pieds noirs while the commune or district had 12,755, of which 2,640 were pieds noirs.

Thénia was very near to the offshore epicenter of the May 21, 2003 Boumerdès earthquake, the strongest quake to hit Algeria since 1980.

At least four people were killed and around twenty injured by a car bomb outside a police station in the town on 29 January 2008.

French conquest

 Battle of Thénia (1837), a battle during the French conquest of Algeria.
 First Battle of the Issers (1837), a battle during the French conquest of Algeria.
 Battle of Thénia (1846), a battle during the French conquest of Algeria.
 Battle of Thénia (1871), a battle during the Mokrani Revolt of Algeria.

Algerian Revolution

 Ferme Gauthier

Salafist terrorism

 2008 Thénia bombing (29 January 2008)
 2012 Thénia bombing (11 January 2012)

Roads

The town of Thénia contains dozens of roads in its urban network:
 Yahia Boushaki Boulevard

Rivers

This commune is crossed by several rivers:
 Isser River
 Meraldene River

Dam

This commune has one dam:
 Meraldene Dam

Football clubs

Notable people

References

Thénia
Populated places in Boumerdès Province